The 1935–36 SK Rapid Wien season was the 38th season in club history.

Squad

Squad and statistics

Squad statistics

Fixtures and results

League

Cup

Mitropa Cup

References

1935-36 Rapid Wien Season
Rapid